Club Béisbol Viladecans is a División de Honor de Béisbol baseball club in Viladecans, Catalonia, Spain. It was founded in 1945 and was one of the most active teams during the heyday of baseball in Spain in the 1950s and 1960s. Club Beisbol Viladecans was one of the few teams that survived the difficult times of the late 1960s and 1970s, when mass-interest in football (soccer) compromised the viability of other local baseball clubs.

The field of the Club Beisbol Viladecans was officially used during the 1992 Summer Olympics for baseball.

Trophies
División de Honor: 4
1980, 1985, 1987, 1993
Copa del Rey: 19
1982, 1983, 1984, 1985, 1986, 1987, 1988, 1989, 1990, 1991, 1992, 1993, 1994, 1995, 1996, 1997, 1998, 1999, 2000

Awards
In 1957 Club Beisbol Viladecans won the Radio Ciudad de Barcelona Trophy, its first significant victory.
21 times Champion of Spain in the senior category from 1982 to 2002. 
Winner of the Spanish Cup in 1982. 
Champion of Spain in the female junior category in 1986.

See also
History of baseball outside the United States

References

Former CB Viladecans official webpage

External links
Official website

Baseball teams in Catalonia
Viladecans